The 2021–22 FIBA Europe Cup play-offs began on 9 March and concluded on 20 and 27 April 2022 with the 2022 FIBA Europe Cup Finals, decided the champions of the 2021–22 FIBA Europe Cup. A total of eight teams competed in the play-offs.

Format
Each tie in the knockout phase, was played over two legs, with each team playing one leg at home.

Bracket

Quarterfinals
The first legs were played on 9 and 10 March 2022, and the second legs were played on 16 March 2022.

|}

ZZ Leiden vs. Hakro Merlins Crailsheim

Oradea vs. Bakken Bears

UnaHotels Reggio Emilia vs. Legia Warsaw

Bahçeşehir Koleji vs. Sporting CP

Semifinals
The first legs were played on 30 March 2022, and the second legs were played on 6 April 2022.

|}

ZZ Leiden vs. Bahçeşehir Koleji

UnaHotels Reggio Emilia vs.  Bakken Bears

Finals

The first leg was played on 20 April 2022, and the second legs was played on 27 April 2022.

|}

References

External links
 

2021–22 FIBA Europe Cup
FIBA Europe Cup Play-offs